The office of the Mayor of Charlotte, North Carolina is currently held by Democrat Vi Lyles, who took office in December 2017 after defeating Republican Kenny Smith in the November election.

The office was established in 1853, when William F. Davidson was elected to serve as intendent. In 1861, the title was changed from intendent to mayor. Below is a list of people who have served as the mayor of Charlotte.

Charlotte mayors serve two-year terms and elections take place in off-years. The longest-serving mayor is Pat McCrory, who served from 1995 to 2009.

List of mayors of Charlotte

See also
 Timeline of Charlotte, North Carolina

References

External links
Char-Meck homepage – Past Mayors

charlotte